Pejorative demonyms